Eutheia is a genus of beetles belonging to the family Staphylinidae.

The genus was first described by James Francis Stephens in 1830.

The species of this genus are found in Europe and Northern America.

Species:
 Eutheia plicata
 Eutheia schaumi
 Eutheia scydmaenoides

References

Scydmaeninae
Staphylinidae genera